Lycée Jean Renoir is a French international school in Munich, Germany, operated by the Agency for French Teaching Abroad. About 1,415 students attend the school. It serves levels maternelle (preschool) through lycée (senior high school).

The primary school is located in Giesing while the secondary school is in Sendling. The largest class sizes are 20-25 students.

History
It was established in 1953. Named after the director Jean Renoir, it had 165 students in 1965. It moved into a standalone campus at Oettingenstraße.

See also
 La Gazette de Berlin
German international schools in France:
 Internationale Deutsche Schule Paris
 DFG / LFA Buc
 Deutsche Schule Toulouse

References

External links

  Lycée Jean Renoir

French international schools in Germany
International schools in Bavaria
Schools in Munich
Educational institutions established in 1953
1953 establishments in Germany